Challenger: The Final Flight (also known as Challenger) is a 2020 American docuseries developed by Glen Zipper and Steven Leckart for Netflix. The series revolves around the day the Space Shuttle Challenger disintegrated and events that preceded launch and aftermath of the tragedy.

The series includes Christa McAuliffe's preparation for the flight, problems with the solid rocket boosters, a teleconference between NASA and Morton Thiokol the night prior to launch, accounts from the astronauts' families who witnessed the explosion from the ground, and the investigation into the catastrophe, while archive footage is used to delve into the Space Shuttle program.

The series was released on September 16, 2020, on Netflix.

Synopsis 

On January 28, 1986, the Space Shuttle Challenger broke apart 73 seconds into its ascent, killing all seven crew members, including New Hampshire high school teacher, Christa McAuliffe, who was to be the first civilian in space. The tragedy sent shockwaves across the United States and resulted in the Space Shuttle program being grounded for 32 months.

Interviews 

Challenger features interviews with families of the STS-51-L crew, former NASA officials and astronauts, employees of Morton Thiokol (manufacturer of the solid rocket boosters), members of the Rogers Commission investigation board, and journalists involved in exposing a cover-up:

 Arnold Aldrich
 Peter Billingsley
 Philip Boffey
 Lisa Bristol
 Richard Cook
 Richard Covey
 Robert Crippen
 Frederick Gregory
 William Harwood
 Kris Jacques
 Marcia Jarvis
 Alton Keel
 Joe Kilminster
 Donald Kutyna
 William Lucas
 Allan McDonald
 Cheryl McNair
 Barbara Morgan
 Lawrence Mulloy
 Steve Nesbitt
 Brian Russell
 David Sanger
 June Scobee Rodgers
 Rhea Seddon
 Leslie Serna
 Scott Smith
 Alison Smith Balch
 Jane Smith-Wolcott
 Richard Truly
 John Zarrella

Episodes

Release 

The official trailer was released on September 2, 2020.

Reception 

On review aggregator Rotten Tomatoes, the series holds an approval rating of 84% based on 19 reviews, with an average rating of 8.2/10. The website's critics consensus reads, "Challenger: The Final Flight doesn't uncover any new information, but intimate interviews elevate its well-crafted, heartbreaking retelling of an avoidable national tragedy." Metacritic, which used a weighted average, assigned the series a score of 76 out of 100 based on 11 reviews, indicating "generally favourable reviews".

See also 

 Columbia: The Tragic Loss

References

External links
 
 

2020 American television series debuts
2020 American television series endings
2020s American documentary television series
Documentary television series about aviation
Documentary television series about historical events in the United States
English-language Netflix original programming
Netflix original documentary television series
Space Shuttle Challenger disaster
Television series about astronauts
Television series about NASA